The 1848 United States presidential election was the 16th quadrennial presidential election, held on Tuesday, November 7, 1848. In the aftermath of the Mexican–American War, General Zachary Taylor of the Whig Party defeated Senator Lewis Cass of the Democratic Party.

Despite Taylor's unclear political affiliations and beliefs, and the Whig opposition to the Mexican–American War, the 1848 Whig National Convention nominated the popular general over party stalwarts such as Henry Clay and Daniel Webster. For vice president, the Whigs nominated Millard Fillmore, a New York Whig known for his moderate views on slavery. Incumbent President James K. Polk, a Democrat, honored his promise not to seek re-election, leaving his party's nomination open. The 1848 Democratic National Convention nominated Senator Lewis Cass of Michigan after former President Martin Van Buren withdrew his bid for a second term over a platform dispute. Van Buren broke from his party to lead the ticket of the Free Soil Party, which opposed the extension of slavery into the territories.

The Whig choice of Zachary Taylor was made almost out of desperation; he was not clearly committed to Whig principles, but he was popular for leading the war effort. The Democrats had a record of prosperity and had acquired the Mexican cession and parts of Oregon country. It appeared almost certain that they would win unless the Whigs picked Taylor. Taylor won a plurality of the popular vote and a majority of the electoral vote, while Van Buren won 10.1% of the popular vote, a strong showing for a third party candidate.

Taylor's victory made him the second of two Whigs to win a presidential election, following William Henry Harrison's victory in the 1840 presidential election. Like Harrison, Taylor died during his term, and he was succeeded by Fillmore.

Nominations

Whig Party nomination

The Whig Party held its national convention in Philadelphia, Pennsylvania, with delegates from every state except for Texas although the Texas Whigs had selected to make the Louisiana delegates their proxies. Henry Clay, Winfield Scott, Zachary Taylor, and Daniel Webster sought the presidential nomination and Taylor led on every ballot before winning on the fourth ballot. After Webster turned down the vice presidential candidacy, Millard Fillmore received the party's vice-presidential nomination on the second ballot after defeating Abbott Lawrence, a Massachusetts politician whose mild opposition to slavery led him to be dubbed a "Cotton Whig". An attempt was made to make both nominations unanimous, but it was unsuccessful due to Taylor's support for the Whig Party being seen as dubious.

Democratic Party nomination

The Democratic Party held its national convention in Baltimore, Maryland. There was a credentials dispute over the New York delegation between the Barnburners and Hunkers factions with the Barnburners being anti-slavery. The delegates voted 126 to 125 to seat both delegations and share their control of New York's votes, but the Barnburners left the convention in disagreement with the compromise while the Hunkers refused to vote.

As a result of Van Buren's withdrawal, U.S. Senator Lewis Cass and Secretary of State James Buchanan were seen as the only serious contenders for the presidential nomination, with a draft effort also focusing on Supreme Court associate justice Levi Woodbury. In stark contrast to the highly contested and protracted convention at the previous election, Cass held a wide lead on all four ballots, only being denied victory on the third due to the convention rules requiring a two-thirds majority, before the Buchanan and Woodbury campaigns quietly released enough delegates to allow Cass victory on the fourth ballot. William Orlando Butler won the vice-presidential nomination on the second ballot against John A. Quitman.

Free Soil Party nomination 

Members of the Whig Party who opposed slavery, New York Barnburners, and members of the Liberty Party met in August 1848 in Buffalo, New York, to found a new political party. The Barnburners made a call for the formation of an anti-slavery party at their conclave in June, and by the People's Convention of Friends of Free Territory, which was organized by Salmon P. Chase, in Columbus, Ohio. The convention was attended by 165 delegates from eight states to form the Free Soil Party.

Van Buren won the party's presidential nomination against John P. Hale on the first ballot with 244 votes against Hale's 181 votes. Hale had been nominated by the Liberty Party in October 1847, but withdrew from the election after the Free Soil Party gave its presidential nomination to Van Buren. Charles F. Adams won the party's vice-presidential nomination.

Van Buren knew that the Free Soilers had not the slightest chance of winning, rather that his candidacy would split the Democratic vote and throw the election to the Whigs. Bitter and aging, Van Buren did not care despite the fact that his life had been built upon the rock of party solidarity and party regularity. He loathed Lewis Cass and the principle of popular sovereignty with equal intensity.

Liberty Party nomination 

Despite their significant showing in the prior presidential election, certain events would conspire to remove the Liberty Party from political significance.

Initially, the party's presidential nomination was to be decided in the fall of 1847 at a Convention in Buffalo, New York. There, Senator John P. Hale was nominated for president over Gerrit Smith, brother-in-law to the party's previous presidential nominee James G. Birney. Leicester King, a former judge and state senator in Ohio, was nominated for vice president. Anti-slavery Democrats and Whigs, disappointed with their respective nominees, would form a new movement in conjunction with members of the Liberty Party such as John Hale and Salmon Chase to form the Free Soil Party that summer. At this point, both Hale and King withdrew in favor of a Free Soil ticket led by former President Martin Van Buren, and the great majority of members of the Liberty Party followed them into the new political party. A small faction refused to support Van Buren for the presidency, however. They held another convention in June 1848 as the "National Liberty Party." Gerrit Smith was nominated for president almost unanimously with Charles Foote, a religious minister from Michigan, as his vice presidential running mate.

Other nominations 

The Native American Party, a precursor to the Know Nothings, which had split from the Whig Party in 1845, met in September 1847 in Philadelphia, where they nominated Zachary Taylor for president and Henry A. S. Dearborn of Massachusetts for vice president.  However, when the Whig Party nominated Taylor for the presidency with Millard Fillmore as his running mate the following year, this rendered his previous nomination moot and the Native American Party failed to make an alternate nomination.

The Industrial Congress held in Philadelphia on June 13, 1848, nominating Gerrit Smith, nominee of the Liberty Party, as their Presidential candidate, and William S. Wait of Illinois for Vice President. This meeting, inspired by the National Reform Association, was primarily focused on workers rights. It established a platform that included planks on land limitation, the reduction of public official's salaries, abolition of the standing army, tariff reduction, and a reduced work week.

General election

Campaign 
The campaign was fought without much enthusiasm, and practically without an issue. Neither of the two great parties made an effort to rally the people to the defense of any important principle.

Whig campaigners, who included Abraham Lincoln and Rutherford B. Hayes, talked up Taylor's "antiparty" opposition to the Jacksonian commitment to the spoils system and yellow-dog partisanship. In the South, they stressed that he was a Louisiana slaveholder, while in the North they highlighted his Whiggish willingness to defer to Congress on major issues (which he subsequently did not do).

Democrats repeated, as they had for many years, their opposition to a national bank, high tariffs, and federal subsidies for local improvements. The Free Soilers branded both major parties lackeys of the Slave Power, arguing that the rich planters controlled the agenda of both parties, leaving the ordinary white man out of the picture. They had to work around Van Buren's well-known reputation for compromising with slavery.

The Whigs had the advantage of highlighting Taylor's military glories. With Taylor remaining vague on the issues, the campaign was dominated by personalities and personal attacks, with the Democrats calling Taylor vulgar, uneducated, cruel and greedy, and the Whigs attacking Cass for graft and dishonesty. The division of the Democrats over slavery allowed Taylor to dominate the Northeast.

The Free Soilers were on the ballots in only 17 of the 29 states with the popular vote, making it mathematically possible for Van Buren to win the presidency, but he had no real chance. Still, the party campaigned vigorously, particularly in the traditional Democratic strongholds in the northeast.

While some Free Soilers were hopeful of taking enough states to throw the election into the House of Representatives, Van Buren himself knew this was a long shot and that the best that his party could do was lay the groundwork for a hopefully improved showing in 1852.

1848 campaign artwork

Records
This was the first election where the two leading candidates each carried half of the states.  As of 2022, it has subsequently happened twice, in 1880 and again in 2020.

This was the first time in the Second Party System in which the victorious party failed to gain at least a plurality of the counties as well as of the popular vote.

This was the last election in which Connecticut, Delaware, Florida, Georgia, Louisiana, Maryland, New Jersey, New York, North Carolina, Pennsylvania, and Rhode Island voted for the Whigs. It was also the last time that Georgia voted against the Democrats until 1964, the last time Delaware and Louisiana did so until 1872, and the last time Florida and North Carolina did so until 1868.

Discounting Republican Abraham Lincoln's 1864 re-election on the National Union ticket, Taylor is the most recent individual who was not a member of either the Democratic Party or the Republican Party to win a presidential election. The contest was the first presidential election that took place on the same day in every state, and it was the first time that Election Day was statutorily a Tuesday. It is also the first election in which the two candidates that received electoral votes carried the same number of states and the only time that it happened between Democrat and Whig candidates. This would only happen again twice, in 1880 and 2020.

Results 

With Taylor as their candidate, the Whigs won their second and last victory in a Presidential election. Taylor won the electoral college by capturing 163 of the 290 electoral votes. Taylor out-polled Cass in the popular vote by 138,000 votes, winning 47% of the popular vote, and was elected president.

A shift of less than 6000 votes to Cass in Georgia and Maryland would have left the electoral college in a 145–145 tie, while a shift of less than 27,000 votes to Van Buren in Connecticut, Maine and Massachusetts would have left both Taylor and Cass short of the 146 electoral votes required to win, forcing a contingent election in the House of Representatives.

A study of the county returns reveals that Free Soil strength drawn at the expense of the major parties differed by region. In the East North Central States, it appears at least the majority of the Free Soil strength was drawn from the Whig Party.

Conversely, in the Middle Atlantic region, Free Soil bases of strength lay in the areas which had hitherto been Democratic, particularly in New York and northern Pennsylvania. The Free Soil Democrats nomination of Van Buren made the victory of Taylor nearly certain in New York. On election day, enough Democratic votes were drawn away by Van Buren to give the Whig ticket all but two Democratic counties, thus enabling it to carry hitherto impregnable parts of upper New York state. The Democrats, confronted with an irreparable schism in New York, lost the election.

In New England, the Democratic vote declined by 33,000 from its 1844 level, while the Whig vote likewise declined by 15,000 votes. The third-party vote tripled, and the total vote remained nearly stationary: a partial indication, perhaps, of the derivation of the Free Soil strength in this section. For the first time since the existence of the Whig Party, the Whigs failed to gain an absolute majority of the vote in Massachusetts and Vermont. In addition, the Democrats failed to retain their usual majority in Maine; thus only New Hampshire (Democratic) and Rhode Island (Whig) of the states in this section gave their respective victorious parties clear-cut majorities.

Of the 1,464 counties/independent cities making returns, Cass placed first in 753 (51.43%), Taylor in 676 (46.17%), and Van Buren in 31 (2.12%). Four counties (0.27%) in the West split evenly between Taylor and Cass.

The election has sometimes been described as "a contest without an issue," as both major candidates sought to steer clear of divisive subjects. The historian George Pierce Garrison famously quipped that "practically the only thing it decided was that a Whig general should be made President because he had done effective work in carrying on a Democratic war."

Source (Popular Vote): 
Source (Electoral Vote): 
(a) The popular vote figures exclude South Carolina where the Electors were chosen by the state legislature rather than by popular vote.

Geography of results

Cartographic gallery

Results by state

Close states

States where the margin of victory was under 5%:
Alabama 1.12% (691 votes)
Mississippi 1.20% (634 votes)
Virginia 1.60% (1,474 votes)
Illinois 2.49% (3,099 votes)
Georgia 2.98% (2,747 votes)
Indiana 3.16% (4,838 votes)
Wisconsin 3.20% (1,254 votes)
Pennsylvania 3.62% (13,337 votes) (tipping point state)
New Jersey 4.01% (3,114 votes)
Delaware 4.26% (530 votes)
Maryland 4.38% (3,174 votes)

States where the margin of victory was under 10%:
Ohio 5.00% (16,414 votes)
Tennessee 5.04% (6,179 votes)
Connecticut 5.24% (3,267 votes)
Maine 5.62% (4,922 votes)
Iowa 5.87% (1,308 votes)
Louisiana 9.18% (3,108 votes)

Electoral college selection 

* Massachusetts law provided that the state legislature would choose the Electors if no slate of Electors could command a majority of voters statewide. In 1848, this provision was triggered, although the legislature ultimately chose the electors of the plurality vote winner, Taylor.

See also 
 1848–49 United States House of Representatives elections
 1848–49 United States Senate elections
 American election campaigns in the 19th century
 History of the United States (1789–1849)
 Inauguration of Zachary Taylor

References

Bibliography 
 Blue, Frederick J. The Free Soilers: Third Party Politics, 1848–54 (1973).
 Boritt, G. S. "Lincoln's Opposition to the Mexican War," Journal of the Illinois State Historical Society Vol. 67, No. 1, Abraham Lincoln Issue (Feb. 1974), pp. 79–100 online
 Campbell, Randolph. "The Whig Party of Texas in the Elections of 1848 and 1852." Southwestern Historical Quarterly 73.1 (1969): 17-34. online

 Earle, Jonathan H. Jacksonian Antislavery and the Politics of Free Soil, 1828–1854 (2004).
 Eyal, Yonatan. "The 'Party Period' Framework and the Election of 1848", Reviews in American History Volume 38, Number 1, March 2010,  in Project MUSE
 Graebner, Norman A. "Thomas Corwin and the Election of 1848: A Study in Conservative Politics." Journal of Southern History, 17 (1951), 162–79. in JSTOR
 Hamilton, Holman. Zachary Taylor: Soldier in the White House (1951)
 Holt; Michael F. The Rise and Fall of the American Whig Party: Jacksonian Politics and the Onset of the Civil War. (1999). online edition

 Mieczkowski, Yanek. "The Election of 1848." in The Routledge Historical Atlas of Presidential Elections (Routledge, 2013) pp. 45-46.
 Morrison, Michael A. "New Territory versus No Territory": The Whig Party and the Politics of Western Expansion, 1846–1848," Western Historical Quarterly, Vol. 23, No. 1 (Feb. 1992), pp. 25–51 in JSTOR
 Nevins, Allan. Ordeal of the Union: Volume I. Fruits of Manifest Destiny, 1847–1852 (1947).
 Quist, John W. "The Election of 1848." in American Presidential Campaigns and Elections (Routledge, 2020) pp. 328-348.
 Rayback, Joseph G. Free Soil: The Election of 1848. (1970).
 Silbey, Joel H. Party Over Section: The Rough and Ready Presidential Election of 1848 (2009). 205 pp.

Primary sources
 Chester, Edward W  A guide to political platforms (1977) online
 Porter, Kirk H. and Donald Bruce Johnson, eds. National party platforms, 1840-1964 (1965) online 1840-1956
  Serio, Anne Marie. Political cartoons in the 1848 election campaign (1972) online

External links 

 Presidential Election of 1848: A Resource Guide from the Library of Congress
 1848 popular vote by counties
 1848 Election State-by-State popular results
 The Election of 1848
 Election of 1848 in Counting the Votes 

 
Martin Van Buren
Millard Fillmore
Zachary Taylor
Presidency of Zachary Taylor
November 1848 events